The Nevada Senate is the upper house of the Nevada Legislature, the state legislature of U.S. state of Nevada, the lower house being the Nevada Assembly. It currently (2012–2021) consists of 21 members from single-member districts. In the previous redistricting (2002–2011) there were 19 districts, two of which were multimember. Since 2012, there have been 21 districts, each formed by combining two neighboring state assembly districts. Each State Senator represented approximately 128,598 as of the 2010 United States Census. Article Four of the Constitution of Nevada sets that State Senators serve staggered four-year terms.

In addition, the size of the Senate is set to be no less than one-third and no greater than one-half of the size of the Assembly. Term limits, limiting senators to three 4-year terms (12 years), took effect in 2010.  Because of the change in Constitution, seven senators were termed out in 2010, four were termed out in 2012, and one was termed out in 2014. The Senate met at the Nevada State Capitol in Carson City until 1971, when a separate Legislative Building was constructed south of the Capitol.  The Legislative Building was expanded in 1997 to its current appearance to accommodate the growing Legislature.

History

Boom and Bust era (1861–1918)
The first session of the Nevada Territorial Legislature was held in 1861.  The Council was the precursor to the current Senate and the opposite chamber was called a House of Representatives which was later changed to be called the Assembly.  There were nine members of the original Council in 1861 elected from districts as counties were not yet established. Counties were established in the First Session of the Territorial Legislature and the size of the Council was increased to thirteen.  From the first session of the Nevada Legislature once statehood was granted the size of the Senate ranged from eighteen members, in 1864, to a low of fifteen members from 1891 through 1899, and a high of twenty-five members from 1875 through 1879.

Little Federalism era (1919–1966)
In 1919 the Senate started a practice called "Little Federalism," where each county received one member of the Nevada Senate regardless of population of said county. This set the Senate membership at seventeen which lasted until 1965–1967. The Supreme Court of the United States issued the opinion in Baker v. Carr in 1962 which found that the redistricting of state legislative districts are not political questions, and thus are justiciable by the federal courts.  In 1964, the U.S. Supreme Court heard Reynolds v. Sims and struck down state senate inequality, basing their decision on the principle of "one person, one vote."  With those two cases being decided on a national level, Nevada Assemblywoman Flora Dungan and Las Vegas resident Clare W. Woodbury, M.D. filed suit in 1965 with the Nevada District Court arguing that Nevada's Senate districts violated the equal protection clause of the Fourteenth Amendment of the Constitution of the United States and lacked of fair representation and proportional districts.  At the time, less than 8 percent of the population of the State of Nevada controlled more than 50 percent of the Senate.  The District Court found that both the Senate and the Assembly apportionment laws were "invidiously discriminatory, being based upon no constitutionally valid policy."  It was ordered that Governor Grant Sawyer call a Special Session to submit a constitutionally valid reapportionment plan. The 11th Special Session lasted from October 25, 1965 through November 13, 1965 and a plan was adopted to increase the size of the Senate from 17 to 20.

Modern Era (1967–present)
The first election after the judicial intervention and newly adopted apportionment law was 1966 and its subsequent legislature consisted of 40 members from the Assembly and 20 members from the Senate.  Nine incumbent Senators from 1965 were not present in the legislature in 1967.  In the 1981 Legislative Session the size of the Senate was increased to twenty-one because of the population growth in Clark County. Following the 2008 election, Democrats took control of the Nevada Senate for the first time since 1991. In January 2011, Senator William Raggio resigned after 38 years of service.  On January 18, 2011 the Washoe County Commission selected former member of the Nevada Assembly and former United States Attorney Gregory Brower to fill the vacancy and remainder of the term of Senator William Raggio. After the 76th Session and the decennial redistricting the boundary changes and demographic profiles of the districts prompted a resignation of Senator Sheila Leslie, in February 2012, and she announced her intention to run against Sen. Greg Brower in 2012.  Later in February 2012, citing personal reasons, Senator Elizabeth Halseth resigned her suburban/rural Clark County seat.

Legislative sessions

Current session

Historical activity of political parties

    Democratic Party (1864–Present)
  National Union Party (1864–1869)
    Republican Party (1871–present)
  Citizen's Party (1879–1881)
    People's Party (1893–1899)
  Silver Party (1893–1907)
  Silver-Democrat Party (1899–1909)
    Socialist Party (1913–1915)
 Independent candidates have been elected to the Senate sporadically from 1863 through 1965

Composition and leadership of the 82nd Legislative session

Presiding over the Senate

The President of the Senate is the body's highest officer, although they only vote in the case of a tie, and only on procedural matters. Per Article 5, Section 17 of the Nevada Constitution, the Lieutenant Governor of Nevada serves as Senate President. In their absence, the President Pro Tempore presides and has the power to make commission and committee appointments. The President Pro Tempore is elected to the position by the majority party. The other partisan Senate leadership positions, such as the Leader of the Senate and Minority Leader, are elected by their respective party caucuses to head their parties in the chamber. The current President of the Senate is Nevada Lieutenant Governor Stavros Anthony of the Republican Party.

Non-member officers

On the first day of a regular session, the Senate elects the non-member, nonpartisan administrative officers including the Secretary of the Senate and the Senate Sergeant at Arms. The Secretary of the Senate serves as the Parliamentarian and Chief Administrative Officer of the Senate and the Sergeant at Arms is chief of decorum and order for the Senate floor, galleries, and committee rooms. Claire J. Clift was originally appointed by then Republican Senate Majority Leader William Raggio. The Democratic Party took the Majority in 2008 and she was retained until 2010. In August 2010, then Senate Majority Leader Steven Horsford appointed David Byerman as the 41st Secretary of the Senate. The day after the 2014 General Election, David Byerman was removed from his position and the previous Secretary, Claire J. Clift was re-appointed. Retired Chief of Police, Robert G. Milby was chosen as the Senate Sergeant at Arms for the 78th Legislative by the Republican Majority Leader.  Both of the elected non-member officers serve at the pleasure of the Senate, thus they have a two-year term until the succeeding session. The Senate also approves by resolution the remainder of the nonpartisan Senate Session staff to work until the remainder of the 120 calendar day session.

82nd Session leadership

Leadership

Majority leadership

Minority leadership

Members of the 82nd Senate
Districts of the Nevada Assembly are nested inside the Senate districts, two per Senate district. The final Legislative redistricting plans as created by the Special Masters in 2011 and approved by District Court Judge James Todd Russell represent the first time since statehood Nevada's Assembly districts are wholly nested inside of a Senate district. Each Assembly district represents 1/42nd of Nevada's population and there are two Assembly districts per Senate district which represents 1/21st of Nevada's population.

1 Senator was originally appointed.
2 Due to term limits in the Nevada Constitution this individual is not eligible for re-election or appointment to the Nevada Senate

Senate standing committees of the 80th Session

Standing committees in the Senate have their jurisdiction set by the Senate Rules as adopted through Senate Resolution 1.  To see an overview of the jurisdictions of standing committees in the Senate, see Standing Rules of the Senate, Section V, Rule 40.

Diversity in the Nevada Senate

African American senators
Nevada's State Senate has included eight self-reported African-American Senators.

Hispanic/Latino senators
Nevada's State Senate has included five self-reported Hispanic/Latino Senators.

Women in the Senate
Since statehood, 37 women have served in the Nevada Senate, seven of them were originally appointed to fill a vacancy.  Twenty-six out of the 34 have been Democrats, 11 have been Republicans, one was elected as a Republican but switched to Non-Partisan and chose to caucus with the Democrats.

LGBT senators
Nevada's State Senate has included five out LGBT Senators.

Past composition of the Senate

See also
Nevada State Capitol
Nevada Legislature
Nevada Assembly

References

External links
Nevada Senate official government website
Project Vote Smart – State Senate of Nevada

Senate
State upper houses in the United States